Chańcza  is a village in the administrative district of Gmina Raków, within Kielce County, Świętokrzyskie Voivodeship, in south-central Poland.

The village has a population of 441.

Next to the village, there is Chańcza artificial lake.

References

Villages in Kielce County